FC Ismaning is a German association football club based in Ismaning by Munich, Bavaria.

History
The 700 member club was founded in March 1921 and played in lower-tier competition until the mid-90s when the footballers advanced for the first time to the Landesliga Bayern-Süd (V). Ismaning enjoyed its most successful season to date in 1999–2000 when it took the Landesliga title to move up to the Oberliga Bayern (IV) and also captured the Bavarian Cup. The regional cup win led to the side's participation in the DFB-Pokal (German Cup) tournament where it was put out by Bundesliga club Borussia Dortmund (0–4) in the first round. The team has played in the fourth tier for seven seasons and earned three consecutive third-place results from 2003–2005. After this, the club's fortunes took a dive with a 14th-place finish in 2006–07, when relegation was narrowly avoided. The 2007–08 season saw improvement however when the club finished tenth in the Oberliga. In 2009–10, the club had showed its best performance in the league yet, finishing second.

They won the Bayernliga on 21 May 2011 with a 4–1 win at home to SV Seligenporten but declined to apply for a Regionalliga licence and were therefore not promoted. At the end of the 2011–12 season the club managed to finish in the top nine of the Bayernliga and thereby directly qualified for the new tier four Regionalliga Bayern. In the 2012–13 season the club struggled in the bottom region of the table all season and was eventually relegated back to the Bayernliga. Ismaning finished last in the Bayernliga in 2013–14 and was relegated after losing to TuS Holzkirchen in the relegation round. After two seasons in the Landesliga a division title in 2015–16 took the club back up to the Bayernliga.

FC Ismaning plays its home fixtures in the Stadion an der Lindenstraße (capacity 5,000).

Honours
The club's honours:

League
 Bayernliga (V)
 Champions 2011
 Runners-up: 2010
 Landesliga Bayern-Süd (V)
 Champions: 2000
 Landesliga Bayern-Südost (VI)
 Champions: 2016
 Bezirksoberliga Oberbayern (VI)
Runners-up: 1996
 Bezirksliga Oberbayern-Nord (VI)
Runners-up: 1989
 Bezirksliga Oberbayern-Ost (VI)
 Champions: 1994

Cup
 Bavarian Cup
 Winner: 2000
 Oberbayern Cup
 Winner: 2000

Recent managers
Recent managers of the club:

Recent seasons
The recent season-by-season performance of the club:

With the introduction of the Bezirksoberligas in 1988 as the new fifth tier, below the Landesligas, all leagues below dropped one tier. With the introduction of the Regionalligas in 1994 and the 3. Liga in 2008 as the new third tier, below the 2. Bundesliga, all leagues below dropped one tier. With the establishment of the Regionalliga Bayern as the new fourth tier in Bavaria in 2012 the Bayernliga was split into a northern and a southern division, the number of Landesligas expanded from three to five and the Bezirksoberligas abolished. All leagues from the Bezirksligas onwards were elevated one tier.

DFB-Pokal appearances
The club has qualified for the first round of the DFB-Pokal just once:

Source:

References

Sources
Grüne, Hardy (2001). Vereinslexikon. Kassel: AGON Sportverlag

External links
Official team site
FC Ismaning at Weltfussball.de
Das deutsche Fußball-Archiv historical German domestic league tables (in German)

Association football clubs established in 1921
Football clubs in Germany
Football clubs in Bavaria
Football in Upper Bavaria
1921 establishments in Germany
Munich (district)